The relationship between Pope Benedict XV and Russia occurred in a very special context, that of the 1917 Russian Revolution. The seizure of power by the Bolshevik revolutionaries unleashed an unprecedented wave of persecutions against the Roman Catholic Church and the Russian Orthodox Church, who were forced to cooperate during a time of distress.

Situation at the end of World War I
The end of World War I  brought about the revolutionary development, which Benedict XV had foreseen in his first encyclical. With the Russian Revolution, the Vatican was faced with a new, so far unknown, situation. An ideology and government which rejected not only the Catholic Church but religion as a whole. "The Pope, the Tsar, Metternich, French radicals and German police, are united against communism" said Karl Marx and Friedrich Engels. The Historical Institute of the Soviet Academy of Sciences wrote that the "reactionary policies of the Vatican" were an outgrowth of fear of socialism and hate of communism.

Vatican seen as an ally of capitalism
This fear turned the Vatican into an ally of capitalism. The Catholic Church is seen to have been in a 1000-year alliance with feudalism, just defeated in Russia. In the words of Friedrich Engels, "the Church blessed the feudal order with the gloriole of divine blessings. Her hierarchy was ordered according to feudal principles. She is one of the greatest feudal exploiters."

Communists taking their time
The Communists took their time to get into Church issues, which were not a priority. Lenin "did not want to put the religious question at the forefront, because it does not belong there at all." They did not repeal the Tsarist decrees guaranteeing religious freedom. They even permitted the restoration of the Orthodox Patriarchate, which had been dormant for over 150 years.

Persecution of the Churches
But with time, a persecution of the Churches, including the Catholic Church, began and intensified. All religion, "the opiate of the masses"  was considered hostile to communism, but most of the revolutionary violence was oriented against the Russian Orthodox Church. The new regime began to interfere in spheres, so far reserved for the Church, by legalizing divorce, and issuing civil marriage certificates. Bloody repression of civilians, carried out under the auspices of the Polish Comrade Felix Edmundovich Dzerzhinsky, head of the Cheka, led to public protest.

Arrest of the Russian Patriarch
The Patriarch Tikhon of Moscow issued a solemn anathema against the Communists "for their frightful and bestial murder of people entirely innocent, even people lying sick in bed, in ruthless cruelty, in full daylight without any trial and in defiance of all justice and legality". The Soviets responded by taking away most Church properties and by nationalizing all Church schools. The Patriarch was arrested. Most monasteries were suppressed, and "counter-revolutionary" religious were executed.

Oppressed bishops plead to the Pope
During the winter of 1918–1919, some "twenty bishops were murdered together with thousands of priests and religious". Some hope developed among the United Orthodox in the Ukraine and Armenia, but many of the representatives there disappeared or were jailed in the following years. Several Orthodox bishops from Omsk and Simbirsk wrote an open letter to Pope Benedict XV, as the Father of all Christianity, describing the murder of priests, the destruction of their churches and other persecutions in their areas.

References

Pope Benedict XV
Russian Revolution
Holy See–Russia relations
Holy See–Soviet Union relations